Groves Island is an ice-covered island  long, lying close off the coast of Marie Byrd Land, Antarctica, between Siemiatkowski Glacier and Land Glacier. It was mapped by the United States Geological Survey from surveys  and U.S. Navy air photos (1959–65), and was named by the Advisory Committee on Antarctic Names for Benjamin F. Groves, a meteorologist at Byrd Station, 1964.

See also 
 List of Antarctic and sub-Antarctic islands

References

Islands of Marie Byrd Land